Cryomorpha is a genus in the phylum Bacteroidota (Bacteria).

Etymology
The name Cryomorpha derives from:Greek noun kruos, icy cold, frost; Greek feminine gender noun morphē, shape or form; New Latin feminine gender noun Cryomorpha, cold shape.

Species
The genus contains a single species, namely C. ignava ( Bowman et al. 2003,  (Type species of the genus).; Latin feminine gender adjective ignava, lazy, pertaining to the biochemically and nutritionally inert nature of the species.)

See also
 Bacterial taxonomy
 Microbiology

References 

Bacteria genera
Flavobacteria
Monotypic bacteria genera